Graecobolanthus is a genus of flowering plants belonging to the family Caryophyllaceae.

Its native range is Eastern Mediterranean.

Species:

Graecobolanthus chelmicus 
Graecobolanthus creutzburgii 
Graecobolanthus fruticulosus 
Graecobolanthus graecus 
Graecobolanthus laconicus 
Graecobolanthus thymifolius

References

Caryophyllaceae
Caryophyllaceae genera